I Am You is the debut mixtape by American rapper and singer YNW Melly, released on August 3, 2018, through 300 Entertainment. It features the single "Murder on My Mind", which gained notoriety after the rapper turned himself in for double murder charges on February 13, 2019.

Critical reception

I Am You received generally positive reviews. Robert Halliman of 4orMyPeople praised Melly's vocal abilities, stating "YNW Melly expertly displayed his brilliance on I Am You, as he gave his fans exactly what they were looking for while showing off his talents to a world of new listeners." Writing for AllMusic, Paul Simpson said, "His songs are raw and emotional ballads, showcasing his unfiltered vocals as well as his brash rapping."

Commercial performance
In YNW Melly's home country of the United States, I Am You debuted at number 192 on the US Billboard 200. After the rapper turned himself in for double murder charges in March 2019, the album peaked at number 20 on the chart. In Canada, the mixtape peaked at number 18 on the Canadian Albums Chart. On December 12, 2019, the mixtape was certified Gold by the Recording Industry Association of America for over 500,000 album-equivalent units.

Track listing
Credits adapted from Genius.
All tracks written by Jamell Demons.

Charts

Weekly charts

Year-end charts

Certifications

References

2018 mixtape albums
YNW Melly albums